Cryptolectica capnodecta is a moth of the family Gracillariidae. The species is known from South Africa.

References

Endemic moths of South Africa
Acrocercopinae
Moths of Africa
Moths described in 1961